Repentance is a 2013 psychological horror film written and directed by Philippe Caland, co-written by Shintaro Shimosawa and Yusuf Hassan and starring Forest Whitaker, Anthony Mackie, Mike Epps, Nicole Ari Parker and Sanaa Lathan. Repentance is the first major film production of CodeBlack Films since CodeBlack's merger with Lions Gate Entertainment in May 2012. The film had its limited release in US theaters on February 28, 2014.

Plot summary 
Years after a drunken car crash that almost took his life, Tommy Carter (Mackie) has reinvented himself as a therapist/spiritual advisor who advocates a synthesis of world religions and positivity. He has parlayed this vocation into a successful book release that one day draws the attention of Angel Sanchez (Whitaker), a profoundly troubled man fixated on the "untimely" death of his mother. When Carter takes on Sanchez as a personal client in an effort to raise funds for his indebted brother Ben (Epps), things quickly take a turn for the worse. Angel needs much more than a simple life coach. Plagued by visions of his dead mother, a seance is held by Carter in order for Angel to say goodbye to his mother at which point he suffers a mild breakdown. Subsequently, Carter informs Angel he can no longer treat him. Angel then incapacitates and captures Carter torturing him over the course of days- to confess his sins so to speak. After capturing Carter's wife and brother it is revealed it was the brothers who accidentally ran over Angel's mother the night of their accident. Ben (Epps) then threw her, still living and crying out for help over a bridge to her death. Upon this revelation Angel untapes Carter, leaving him his gun and walks out. As he walks away from his home with his daughter he sees his smiling mother looking down on him and a gunshot rings out, as Carter narrates that both brothers souls are tainted from what happened with them and Angel's mother that night.

Cast 
 Forest Whitaker as Angel Sanchez
 Anthony Mackie as Tommy Carter
 Mike Epps as Ben Carter
 Nicole Ari Parker as Sophie Sanchez
 Sanaa Lathan as Maggie Carter
 Peter Weller as Meyer
 Adella Gautier as Marina Sanchez, Angels mother

Release 
Repentance opened on February 28, 2014, in limited release. The film's opening weekend gross was $501,290 in 152 North American theaters (a per theater average of $3,298). The film remained in theaters in limited release for 4 weeks, earning $1,189,612 in its entire run.
Repentance was available on Digital HD and Video on Demand on June 10, 2014, and was released on Blu-ray and DVD on June 24, 2014.

Reception
Repentance was poorly received by critics. On Rotten Tomatoes it has a score of 20% based on reviews from 5 critics.

References

External links 
 
 
 
 

2013 films
Lionsgate films
2013 psychological thriller films
Films set in Louisiana
African-American films
American psychological thriller films
2010s English-language films
2010s American films